Kyla (Lee) Ward is an Australian writer of speculative fiction, poet and actor. Her work has been nominated multiple times for the Ditmar Award, the Aurealis Award , the Australian Shadows Award , the Bram Stoker Award and the Rhysling Award. She won the Aurealis Award in 2006 for her collaborative novel Prismatic (as by 'Edwina Grey').

Biography
Ward was born in New South Wales, Australia. She attended the University of Technology, Sydney where she gained a BA in communications.

Writing
Ward was first published in 1994 with her poem "Mary" which was featured in the magazine Bloodsongs. In 2002 her short story "The Boneyard" was nominated for the Ditmar Award for best short fiction but lost to Lucy Sussex and Jack Dann. In 2006 she won her first award with the novel Prismatic, co-authored with Evan Paliatseas and David Carroll under the shared pseudonym of Edwina Grey. Prismatic tied with Will Elliott's The Pilo Family Circus to win the Aurealis Award for best horror novel.

Ward has also contributed to role-playing games including Buffy the Vampire Slayer Roleplaying Game by Eden Studios, Inc. and White Wolf's Demon: The Fallen.

Acting

Ward has also been a member of the Theatre of Blood repertory company where she acted and also wrote. In 2018 she became the eponymous Guide to Deadhouse, Tales Of Sydney Morgue, an immersive theatre production devoted to true crime in Sydney city and taking place at historic locations.  Ward wrote and produced and acted in the short film Bad Reception which premiered at A Night of Horror 2009 and screened at the Vampire Film Festival in New Orleans. Ward has also worked as an assistant director and sound recordist in a number of short films, for instance as sound recordist on Indulgence  (1996) (written and directed by Glenn Fraser).

Artwork

Apart from illustrating her own collections, Ward also has contributed artwork for various publications including Fables and Reflections, the cover of Epiphanies of Blood: Tales of Desperation and Thirst, Southern Blood, Borderlands, Bloodsongs, Tabula-Rasa, and Burnt Toast.

Awards and nominations

Bibliography

Novels
Prismatic (2006, with Evan Paliatseas and David Carroll as Edwina Grey)

Collections
 The Land of Bad Dreams (edited by Charles (Danny) Lovecraft). Sydney: P'rea Press, 2011. . Illustrated by the author, poetry and prose. Contains otherwise unpublished work.
Note: The launch of this book was accompanied by dramatic interpretations by various theatre groups. Video of the performances is available on the kylawtr Youtube channel.
Reviewing the volume at Hellnotes, the reviewer praised Ward's work:

 The Macabre Modern and Other Morbidities (edited by Charles (Danny) Lovecraft). Sydney: P'rea Press, 2019 . Illustrated by the author, poetry, prose and essay. Contains otherwise unpublished work.
Note: The launch of this book was accompanied by a "danse macabre". Video of the performances is available on the kylawtr Youtube channel.
 This Attraction Now Open Till Late - strange sights and shadows (edited by Alessandro Manzetti). Trieste: Independent Legions Publishing, 2022 . Cover art by Alessandro Amoruso, short fiction. Contains otherwise unpublished work.

Short fiction
"The Feast" (1999) in Aurealis No. 24 (ed. Dirk Strasser, Stephen Higgins)
"The Boneyard" (2001) in Gothic.net September 2001
"Poison" (2002) in Passing Strange (ed. Bill Congreve)
"Sakoku" (2002) in Agog! Fantastic Fiction (ed. Cat Sparks)
"Kijin Tea" (2003) in Agog! Terrific Tales (ed. Cat Sparks)
"The Oracle of Brick and Bone" (2005) in Borderlands No. 5
"The Bat's Boudoir" (2007) in Shadowed Realms No. 9
"A Tour of the City of Assassins" (2009) in Ticon No. 4
"Cursebreaker: The Welsh Widow and the Wandering Wooer" (2010) in Scary Kisses (ed. Liz Grzyb)
"Erina Hearn and the God of Death" (2010) in Macabre: A Journey Into Australia's Worst Fears (ed. Angela Challis & Marty Young)
"Cursebreaker: The Jikininki and the Japanese Jurist" (2013) in The New Hero: Vol. 1 (ed. Robin D. Laws)
"The Loquacious Cadaver" (2013) in The Lion and the Aardvark: Aesop's Modern Fables (ed. Robin D. Laws)
"Who Looks Back?" (2013) in Shotguns v. Cthulhu (ed. Robin D. Laws)
"The Character Assassin" (2013) in Schemers (ed. Robin D. Laws)
"Cursebreaker: the Mutalibeen and the Memphite Mummies" (2015) in Hear Me Roar (ed. Liz Grzyb)
"The Leucrotta" (2015) in Gods, Memes and Monsters: A Twenty-first Century Bestiary (ed. Heather J. Wood
 "And In Her Eyes the City Drowned" (2018) in Weirdbook #39
 "Should Fire Remember The Fuel?" (2020) in Oz Is Burning, (ed. Phyllis Irene Radford)
 "A Whisper in the Death Pit" (2021) in Weirdbook #44
 "Gargoyles as they Grumble" (2022) in The Gargoylicon - Imaginings and Images of the Gargoyle in Literature and Art, (ed. Frank Coffman)
 "This Attraction Now Open Till Late" (2022) in Vastarien Spring 2022 (Vol 5 #1)

Poems
"Mary" (1994) in Bloodsongs #3 (ed. Chris A. Masters, Steve Proposch)
"Herbal Tea" (1995) in Bloodsongs #6 (ed. Steve Proposch)
"Night Cars" (1999) in Abaddon #2
"The Land of Dreams Gone Bad" (2011) in Midnight Echo #5
"The Exorcism" (2011) in Midnight Echo #5
"The Kite" (2011) in The Land of Bad Dreams
"The Soldier's Return" (2011) in The Land of Bad Dreams
"Lucubration" (2012) in Avatars of Wizardry (ed. Charles Lovecraft)
"Necromancy" (2014) in Spectral Realms #1
"The Stone of Sacrifice" (2016)in Spectral Realms #4
"Dual Purpose" (2017)in Spectral Realms #6
"Vanth – A Myth Derived" (2017) in Eternal Haunted Summer
"Tattered Livery" (2017) in Weirdbook #37
"Libitina's Garden – a triptych" (2018)in Mythic Delirium 4.4
"Revenants of the Antipodes" (2019) in HWA Poetry Showcase V, ed. Stephanie Wytovich
"Mourning Rites”, (2019) in The Audient Void #7
"The Siege", (2020) in HWA Poetry Showcase VII, ed. Stephanie Wytovich
"Lo Stregozzo", (2020) in Eternal Haunted Summer
"Wardrobe Malfunction", (2021) in Infectious Hope: Poems of Hope and Resilience from the Pandemic, ed. Silvia Rondoni

Role-playing games
Mystical Places
"Arcanities" (2001)
"The Schriebach Estate" (2001)
"The Scalper" (2009) in Eden Studio Presents #3
The Demon Storyteller's Guide (2002, co-author)
"Suffer the Children" (2003) in Fear to Tread
"The Court of Chimera" (2009) in Eden Studio Presents #3
"Dominion" (2009) in Pyramid Magazine #3/10
"The Journey of the Dead" (2011) in Pyramid Magazine #3/38

Contributed to:
The Demon Players' Guide (2003)
Damned and Deceived: the Book of Thralls (2003)
Demon: The Earthbound (2003)
Time of Judgment (2004)

Scripts
Bad Reception (2008) directed by Andrew Orman, 4TOD Productions. Screened at A Night of Horror 2009, and the Vampire Film Festival 2009
Chocolate Curses, "a comedy in dubious taste." (2010) directed by Steve Hopley. Played as part of the Season II program of the Theatre of Blood
It's Only Magic, with Jon Blum. Intomedia (2020) directed by Josh Aviet.

Essays
"Scaring the Children" in Bloodsongs No. 8 (ed. Steve Proposch)
"Playing the Classics: Role Playing Your Favorite Novels" (2002) in Black Gate (ed. John O'Neill)
"Reading the Game – Depictions of Role-Playing in Popular Culture" (2013) in Strange Horizons No. 28 (ed. Niall Harrison
"A Shared Ambition - Horror Writers in Horror Fiction" (2017) in Midnight Echo #12
"The Danse Macabre" in The Macabre Modern and Other Morbidities (2019) P'rea Press.
"Vampire Poetry" in Penumbra #2 (2021) Hippocampus Press.

Articles
"Gaming Freeform" (1994) in Australian Realms No. 17
"Australia" (1996) in The BFI Companion to Horror (ed. Kim Newman)
"Castle, Sweet Castle" (2002) in d20weekly.com
"Get Lost" (2004) in Dragon No. 326
"Tomb Raider" (2005) in Dragon No. 327
"The Petit Tarrasque and Other Monsters" (2005) in Dragon No. 329
"Australian Gargoyles" (2007) in Art Monthly Australia No. 200
"Coffin Culture" (2008) in Black: Australian Dark Culture #3
"Dark Humour in Revelation of the Daleks" (2010, with David Carroll and Kate Orman) in Burnt Toast
"Symbolism" (2010, with David Carroll and Kate Orman) in Burnt Toast
"Dungeons and Deadlines" (2011) in WQ Magazine
"Spot the Horror Writer" (2017) in HWA Newsletter #215
"The Blacker the Shadow" (2021) in Outside In Wants To Believe (ed. Stacey Smith?)
"The Whole Dining Room Suite" (2022) in Outside In Walks With Fire (ed. Stacey Smith?)

References
General

"Boys and Ghouls Come Out to Play" (newspaper article focusing on Australian women writers of horror).
 Australian Speculative Fiction: A Genre Overview by Donna Maree Hanson, Aust Speculative Fiction 2005

Specific

External links
[http://www.kylaward.com/

Australian women novelists
Australian women short story writers
Australian poets
Living people
Year of birth missing (living people)
University of Technology Sydney alumni